Malta is a village in DeKalb County, Illinois, United States. The population was 1,143 at the 2020 census.

History
Malta was founded in 1855, under the name of Milton. Shortly afterwards, the name was changed to Etna, then Malta after the Galena Railway station that served the village. The present name is after the island of Malta.

Malta was the site of the first "seedling mile" of concrete pavement for the transcontinental Lincoln Highway in 1914. Seedling miles were built to demonstrate construction techniques and generate support for the highway. The pavement extended from the Malta cemetery at the west edge of town to near the present location of Kishwaukee College.  

Malta struggled financially until the end of World War I, when an influx of new residents to the area arrived. Currently, Malta is a farming community and also supports nearby Kishwaukee College.

Geography
Malta is located at  (41.929243, -88.861743).

Business
Malta has no large businesses.  Most are small operations.  Farming and the agriculture industry surround the town.  Primary crops are corn and soybeans.  Hog confinement operations are near the village.  A bank, gas station/convenience store, excavating company,  grain elevator, apple orchard, small restaurant, a few auto repair facilities, post office, a photographer, a plumbing company, and an auctioneering company make up the businesses in or near the village.  A few individuals in the vicinity have their own businesses that involve carpentry, plumbing, landscaping, and animal control.

Schools
For many years Malta was served by Malta Community Unit School District 433. The District had what was originally a single school house (K-12) in Village limits and eventually a secondary school (7-12) off of Route 38, keeping grades K-6 at the original building.  District 433 was absorbed into neighboring DeKalb Community Unit School District 428 in 2000. 

Kishwaukee College, founded in 1968, is located 1 mile west of Malta. Some of the schools: Malta Elementary, Huntley Middle School, Tyler Elementary, etc

Demographics
As of the 2020 census there were 1,143 people, 475 households, and 322 families residing in the village. The racial makeup of the village was 85.39% White, 2.71% African American, 0.70% Native American, 0.17% Asian, 0.00% Pacific Islander, 4.55% from other races, and 6.47% from two or more races. Hispanic or Latino of any race were 10.06% of the population.

There were 475 households, out of which 75.79% had children under the age of 18 living with them, 55.58% were married couples living together, 3.79% had a female householder with no husband present, and 32.21% were non-families. 23.16% of all households were made up of individuals, and 5.89% had someone living alone who was 65 years of age or older. The average household size was 3.55 and the average family size was 3.01.

The village's age distribution consisted of 27.4% under the age of 18, 7.4% from 18 to 24, 28.2% from 25 to 44, 21.7% from 45 to 64, and 15.3% who were 65 years of age or older. The median age was 38.3 years. For every 100 females, there were 122.9 males. For every 100 females age 18 and over, there were 105.7 males.

The median income for a household in the village was $73,250, and the median income for a family was $86,974. Males had a median income of $40,804 versus $36,023 for females. The per capita income for the village was $28,118. About 14.6% of families and 20.6% of the population were below the poverty line, including 32.1% of those under age 18 and 0.9% of those age 65 or over.

References

External links
History of Malta, Illinois

Populated places established in 1854
Villages in DeKalb County, Illinois
Villages in Illinois
1854 establishments in Illinois